Mikhail Kiselyov (born June 18, 1986, Novoselovo, Kolpashevsky District) is a Russian political figure and deputy of the 8th State Duma.

From 2006 to 2008, he was a member of the Tomsk regional branch of the Russia's Student Teams organization. From 2010 to 2011, he held the position of Deputy Head of the Central Headquarters of the organization. In 2011–2021, Kiselyov was the head of the central headquarters of the Russia's Student Teams. In 2017, he was elected a member of the Civic Chamber of the Russian Federation. In the 2018 Russian presidential election, he was a confidant of Vladimir Putin. He is a member of the All-Russia People's Front. Since September 2021, he has served as deputy of the 8th State Duma.

References

1986 births
Living people
United Russia politicians
21st-century Russian politicians
Eighth convocation members of the State Duma (Russian Federation)